Alura may refer to:
 Alura people, an Australian ethnic group
 Alura (genus), a genus of moths
 Alura (DC Comics), a fictional character
 Alura, a fictional character in Buck Rogers
 Alura (EP), an EP by Sweet Trip

See also 
 Allura (disambiguation)
 Alure